Antonio Rucco (born 5 July 1931) is an Italian sprint canoer who competed in the early 1960s. He finished ninth the K-2 1000 m event at the 1960 Summer Olympics in Rome.

References
Antonio Rucco's profile at Sports Reference.com

1931 births
Canoeists at the 1960 Summer Olympics
Italian male canoeists
Olympic canoeists of Italy
Living people
Place of birth missing (living people)
20th-century Italian people